Adam Gussow (born April 3, 1958) is an American scholar, memoirist, and blues harmonica player.  He is currently a professor of English and Southern Studies at the University of Mississippi in Oxford.

Life and career
Gussow spent twelve years (1986–1998) working the streets of Harlem and the international club and festival circuit with Mississippi-born bluesman Sterling Magee as a duo called Satan and Adam.  Along with Canadian harmonicist Carlos del Junco, Gussow was one of the first amplified blues players, in the late 1980s, to make overblows a key element of his stylistic approach, adapting Howard Levy's innovations in a way that helped usher in a new generation of overblow masters such as Jason Ricci and Chris Michalek.  According to a reviewer for American Harmonica Newsletter, Gussow's playing is characterized by "[t]echnical mastery and innovative brilliance that comes along but once in a generation." When Satan and Adam were honored with a cover story in Living Blues magazine in 1996, Gussow was, according to the editor, "the first white blues musician to be so prominently spotlighted in the magazine’s 26-year history."()

Born in New York City, raised in suburban Congers, New York, educated at Princeton University (B.A. 1979, Ph.D. 2000) and Columbia University (M.A. 1983), Gussow is the son of Alan Gussow, an artist/environmentalist, and Joan Dye Gussow, an author, nutrition educator, and organic farmer.  He has an atypical pedigree for a blues musician. In Mister Satan’s Apprentice:  A Blues Memoir (1998), he credits his career to the mentorship of two older African American performers:  Nat Riddles, a Bronx-born harmonica player who had worked with Odetta, Larry Johnson, and others; and Magee, a guitarist/percussionist with whom Gussow teamed up after a chance afternoon jam session on Harlem’s 125th Street. As Satan and Adam, Magee and Gussow recorded three albums during their years as a touring act: Harlem Blues (1991), which was nominated for a W. C. Handy Award as "Traditional Blues Album of the Year"; Mother Mojo (1993); and Living on the River (1996).  A brief extract of Magee and Gussow performing on 125th Street was included in U2's Rattle and Hum documentary.  Gussow has produced or co-produced two additional Satan and Adam albums: Word on the Street (2008) and Back in the Game (2011).  In August 2010, Gussow released his first album under his own name, Kick And Stomp.  Recorded in Oxford, Mississippi, it features Gussow in a one-man band setting—singing, blowing amplified harmonica, stomping on a foot drum, and clanking on a tambourine pedal.

Gussow's other musical credits include five months with the bus-and-truck tour of Big River; commercials for Coca-Cola, Nestea, and Swatch; and two decades as a harmonica instructor at the Guitar Study Center in New York and Jon Gindick's harmonica jam camps.  In 2010,2011 & 2012, Gussow (along with business partner & entrepreneur Jeff Silverman) organized and produced Hill Country Harmonica, a teaching-intensive event at Foxfire Ranch in Waterford, Mississippi with an evening concert component.  Blues harmonica players and teachers at the first two events have included Billy Branch, Sugar Blue, Jason Ricci, Mitch Kashmar, Phil Wiggins, Annie Raines, Johnny Sansone, Charlie Sayles, Billy Gibson, Jimi Lee, and many others.

In addition to Mister Satan's Apprentice, which received the "Keeping the Blues Alive" Award from the Blues Foundation in Memphis, Gussow is the author of Seems Like Murder Here: Southern Violence and the Blues Tradition (2002); Journeyman's Road:  Modern Blues Lives from Faulkner’s Mississippi to Post-9/11 New York (2007); Busker's Holiday (2015), a novel about the summer busking season in Europe; and Beyond the Crossroads:  The Devil and the Blues Tradition (2017), which won the Living Blues readers' poll as "Best Blues Book of 2017."  Gussow's most recent book is Whose Blues?  Facing Up to Race and the Future of the Music (University of North Carolina Press, 2020). Gussow’s essays and reviews have appeared in Southern Cultures, African American Review, Harper's, The Village Voice, American Literature, and many other publications.

Since uploading his first video on February 22, 2007, Gussow has been running YouTube tutorials aimed at passing on his proficiency and knowledge in the harmonica to those who are interested in learning to play blues harmonica.  Gussow from his first lesson says, "I'm tired of this mystification, I'm going to teach you all I know." As of April 2020, Gussow has uploaded more than 570 videos to a channel with more than 70,000 subscribers; a second channel, started in September 2015, has another 96,000 subscribers and more than 200 videos.

A feature-length documentary about Gussow's decades-long partnership with Magee entitled "Satan & Adam," directed by award-winning filmmaker V. Scott Balcerek and featuring cameos by The Edge, Rev. Al Sharpton, journalist Peter Noel, and others, premiered at the Tribeca Film Festival in April 2018 and streamed on Netflix from June 2019 to June 2021  Gussow's current musical act, Sir Rod & The Blues Doctors, is a trio featuring Magee's nephew, Roderick "Sir Rod" Patterson on vocals, Gussow on harmonica and percussion, and Alan Gross on guitar.

Further reading
Gussow, Adam: Seems Like Murder Here:  Southern Violence and the Blues Tradition.  Chicago:  University of Chicago Press, 2002.
Gussow, Adam: Mister Satan's Apprentice. Minneapolis:  University of Minnesota Press], 2009.
The story of an unlikely musical partnership, the blues, and race in America, with a new preface by the author
Gussow, Adam: Journeyman's Road: Modern Blues Lives from Faulkner's Mississippi to Post-9/11 New York. Knoxville:  University of Tennessee Press, 2007
Gussow, Adam: Busker's Holiday.  Modern Blues Harmonica: 2015
Gussow, Adam: Beyond The Crossroads:  The Devil And The Blues Tradition. Chapel Hill: University of North Carolina Press, 2017
Gussow, Adam: Whose Blues?  Facing Up to Race and the Future of the Music. Chapel Hill: University of North Carolina Press, 2020

References

External links
Modern Blues Harmonica with Adam Gussow website
Adam Gussow, English Department, University of Mississippi website
"Modern Blues Harmonica channel," on YouTube
"Satan & Adam" documentary

1958 births
Living people
American blues harmonica players
American essayists
American memoirists
Harmonica blues musicians
Musicians from New York City
People from Congers, New York